This is the list of notable stars in the constellation Aquarius, sorted by decreasing brightness.

See also 
 List of stars by constellation

References

References

List
Aquarius